Thiago Seyboth Wild was the defending champion but chose not to defend his title.

Francisco Cerúndolo won the title after defeating Andrej Martin 6–4, 3–6, 6–2 in the final.

Seeds

Draw

Finals

Top half

Bottom half

References

External links
Main draw
Qualifying draw

Challenger Ciudad de Guayaquil - Singles
2020 Singles